Flowers for My Father is a solo studio album by American rapper Sadistik, released via Fake Four Inc. on February 19, 2013. "Kill the King" was released as a single from the album.

On June 20, 2013, Respect included the album on the "13 Best Below-the-Radar Projects of the Year (So Far)" list.

Production
The album includes "Micheal", a tribute song to Sadistik's deceased friend Micheal "Eyedea" Larsen. The song samples Peter Gabriel's "In Your Eyes". Larsen's family and friends appeared on the music video for the song. Music videos were also created for "City in Amber", "Russian Roulette", and "Kill the King".

Track listing

References

External links
 
 

2013 albums
Sadistik albums
Fake Four Inc. albums
Albums produced by Blue Sky Black Death